Kumin is a surname. Notable people with the surname include:

Maxine Kumin (1925–2014), American poet and author
Sol Kumin (born 1975), American business leader, thoroughbred racehorse owner, and philanthropist
Vadim Kumin (born 1973), Russian politician

See also
 Cumin, a spice